Adoretus versutus, commonly known as rose beetle, is a species of shining leaf chafer found in Afro-Oriental tropics.

Etymology
Common names of the beetle includes: Indian rose beetle, leaf chafer beetle, rRose beetle, Fijian root grub, and Fijian cane root grub.

Distribution
It is native to Oriental regions and can be found in many Asian countries including: India, Andaman and Nicobar islands, Pakistan, Sri Lanka, and Indonesia. It is also distributed in African islands: Madagascar, Mauritius, St. Helena, Seychelles, Fiji, and Oceanian islands: Samoa, Tonga, Wallis Islands, Cook Islands. Meanwhile, the species has introduced to many countries where they became major pests due to absence of natural predators.

It is also introduced to Vanuatu where it became a serious pest due to absence of predators. It is also found in New Caledonia.

Biology
Lifecycle usually completed in three months. Female known to lay eggs in soil during early part of the monsoon season between May to August. Eggs hatch after 8 to 14 days in soil. Larvae can be seen in around a week and started to feed on roots. During drought periods, larvae move deeper in the soil where the come closer to the surface during wet periods. Pupation completed before the onset of next monsoon. Adults emerge after rainy showers.

Larva
Grubs are whitish translucent in color. The resting posture is C-shaped. Third instar is about 20-25 mm in length. Head reddish brown in color. The last abdominal segment swollen and dark particularly due to the soil ingestion. Spiracles creamy white with 9 pairs in which one pair prothoracic and eight pairs abdominal segments.

Pupa
Pupa yellowish brown where they become much darker in final pupal stages. Full grown pupa is about 16 mm in length.

Adult
Adult beetle has large dark eyes. Body reddish chestnut in color with average length of 12 to 14 mm in length. However, male is smaller than female. Body broader and convex with shiny underside. Scutellum short. Lamellate antennae are brownish, with ten-segments. Last three antennomeres expanded into a plate like structure. Pronotum dark and less densely punctate in the mid region. Clypeus and frons darker. Labrum and labium hairy. There are acute teeth in tibia of first leg pair which helps during burrowing in sand. Elytra brownish with metallic sheen, sclerotized, and punctate. There are fine bristles in elytra, pronotum and head. Female has broader body which is more convex.

Economic importance
A polyphagous pest, it is one of the major pest in cocoa plantations and rose cultivations in Vanuatu and other countries. It also attack shade trees, and ornamentals in Uganda where the outbreak of adults show defoliation. Grubs also attack the roots of wild turmeric.

In Fiji, the larvae can be destroyed by an entomopoxvirus.

host plants

 Abelmoschus manihot
 Acacia
 Acalypha wilkesiana
 Alphitonia zizyphoides
 Anacardium occidentale
 Arachis hypogaea
 Bauhinia
 Barringtonia edulis
 Bougainvillea spectabilis
 Carica papaya
 Citrus limon
 Citrus maxima
 Citrus sinensis
 Citrus x paradisica
 Coffea canephora
 Colocasia esculenta
 Curcuma aromatica
 Delonix regia
 Dioscorea
 Eriobotrya japonica
 Ficus carica
 Hibiscus tiliaceus
 Ipomoea batatas
 Lagerstroemia indica
 Litchi sinensis
 Malus pumila
 Musa
 Pachyrhizus erosus
 Persea americana
 Phaseolus
 Pometia pinnata
 Prunus domestica
 Psidium guajava
 Pyrus communis
 Raphanus sativus
 Rosa
 Saccharum officinarum
 Solanum melongena
 Solanum tuberosum
 Sorghum bicolor
 Syzygium malaccense
 Terminalia catappa
 Terminalia tomentosa
 Terminalia arjuna
 Theobroma cacao
 Vigna unguiculata
 Vitis
 Zingiber officinale
 Zinnia
 Ziziphus jujuba

References

Rutelinae
Insects of Sri Lanka
Insects of India
Insects described in 1869